David Leon Guerrero Shimizu is a Guamanian politician and businessman who served as three term senator of the Guam Legislature from 1991 to 1995 and again from 2007 to 2009, then he also served as the vice-speaker from 2008 to 2009. He is the member of the Democratic Party of Guam.

Education
Shimizu earned a bachelor of arts and master of arts in education from the University of Guam. Shimizu earned a Doctor of Education degree from the University of Massachusetts.

Guam Legislature
Shimizu was first elected in 1990 to and won reelection in 1992 to the Guam Legislature. Shimizu was not reelected in 1994, but was able to return to the Guam Legislature for a single term after the election of 2006.

Elections

References

20th-century American politicians
21st-century American politicians
Chamorro people
Guamanian Democrats
Guamanian politicians of Japanese descent
Living people
Members of the Legislature of Guam
University of Guam alumni
Year of birth missing (living people)